Giovanna Trillini (born 17 May 1970 in Iesi) is an Italian foil fencer. She is a 4-time Olympic champion (3 times in the team event, 1 time individual) and she won an additional silver and two bronze medals in individual Olympic competitions.

Biography
She has two brothers, Ezio and Roberto, who were both fencers. In 2001, she got her degree in Sport Science at the University of Urbino.
Trillini won the bronze medal at the foil 2006 World Fencing Championships after she lost 15–8 to Margherita Granbassi in the semi final. Later in the tournament she also won a silver in the team's foil event together with her teammates Elisa Di Francisca, Margherita Granbassi and Valentina Vezzali.

In 1998 she married Giovanni Battista Rotella. They have two children: Claudia, born on 12 September 2005 and Giovanni, born on 1 August 2009.

Achievements
Olympic Games
 Foil individual (1992) and Foil team (1992, 1996, 2000)
 Foil individual (2004) 
 Foil individual (1996, 2000) and Foil team (2008)

World Championships
 Foil individual (1991, 1997) and Foil team (1990, 1991, 1995, 1997, 1998, 2001, 2004)
 Foil individual (1990, 1995) and Foil team (1986, 1994, 2006)
 Foil individual (1989, 1998, 2006, 2007) and Foil team (1987)

European Championships
 Foil team (1999, 2000)
 Foil individual (2001) 
 Foil individual (1994) and Foil team (1998, 2007)

Fencing World Cup
  Foil (1991, 1994, 1995, 1998)

Honours and awards
: Grande Ufficiale Ordine al Merito della Repubblica Italiana (Italian for: Grand Officer Order of Merit of the Italian Republic ), 1 September 2008

See also
Italian sportswomen multiple medalists at Olympics and World Championships
Italy national fencing team – Multiple medallist
List of multiple Summer Olympic medalists

References

External links
 
 Giovanna Trillini at Eurofencing.info
 Giovanna Trillini at FIE
  
 Profile at federscherma.it 

1970 births
Living people
People from Iesi
University of Urbino alumni
Italian female fencers
Fencers at the 1992 Summer Olympics
Fencers at the 1996 Summer Olympics
Fencers at the 2000 Summer Olympics
Fencers at the 2004 Summer Olympics
Fencers at the 2008 Summer Olympics
Olympic fencers of Italy
Olympic gold medalists for Italy
Olympic silver medalists for Italy
Olympic bronze medalists for Italy
Olympic medalists in fencing
Fencers of Gruppo Sportivo Forestale
Medalists at the 1992 Summer Olympics
Medalists at the 1996 Summer Olympics
Medalists at the 2000 Summer Olympics
Medalists at the 2004 Summer Olympics
Medalists at the 2008 Summer Olympics
Universiade medalists in fencing
Universiade gold medalists for Italy
Universiade bronze medalists for Italy
Medalists at the 1989 Summer Universiade
Medalists at the 1991 Summer Universiade
Medalists at the 1993 Summer Universiade
Sportspeople from the Province of Ancona
20th-century Italian women
21st-century Italian women